The 1983 BYU Cougars football team represented the Brigham Young University (BYU) in the 1983 NCAA Division I-A football season as a member of the Western Athletic Conference (WAC). The team was led by head coach LaVell Edwards, in his twelfth year, and played their home games at Cougar Stadium in Provo, Utah. They finished the season with a record of eleven wins and one loss (11–1, 7–0 WAC), and with a victory over Missouri in the Holiday Bowl. The Cougars offense scored 505 points while the defense allowed 247 points.

Schedule

Reference:

Roster
DE #92 Jim Herrmann
TE Gordon Hudson
RB Casey Tiumalu
LB #53 Cary Whittingham
QB Steve Young
LB Scott Garrett

Game summaries

Utah

Source:

Team players in the NFL
The following were selected in the 1984 NFL Draft.

Reference:

The following were selected in the 1984 NFL Supplemental Draft.

Reference:

Awards and honors
Rex Burningham: Honorable mention All-American, first-team All-WAC
Craig Garrick: Second-team All-WAC
 Brandon Flint: Honorable mention All-American, first-team All-WAC
 Jim Herrmann: Second-team All-WAC
Gordon Hudson: Consensus All-American, first-team All-WAC
Doug Kellermeyer: Second-team All-WAC
Kyle Morrell: Second-team All-WAC
Kirk Pendleton: Second-team All-WAC
Todd Shell: Honorable mention All-American, first-team All-WAC
Casey Tiumalu: Honorable mention All-American, first-team All-WAC
Jon Young: Honorable mention All-American, first-team All-WAC
Steve Young: Sammy Baugh Trophy, Davey O'Brien Award, consensus All-American, first-team All-WAC

References

BYU
BYU Cougars football seasons
Holiday Bowl champion seasons
Western Athletic Conference football champion seasons
BYU Cougars football